Majestic is a 2002 Indian Kannada-language action crime thriller film written and directed by P. N. Satya. The film stars Darshan in the lead role, along with Rekha and Jai Jagadish in other prominent roles. The film was produced by Ullas Enterprises studio. Sadhu Kokila scored the music.

The film was released on February 8, 2002. The film ran successfully for more than 100 days in theatres.  It was the first movie for actor Darshan in the male lead. The film was remade in Telugu as Charminar. The film was rereleased on Darshan's birthday (February 16) in 2022.

Synopsis

Daasa is an orphan, raised by a corrupt policeman, Ranadheera. Daasa makes friends on the streets, and they all become gangsters when they grow up, working for Ranadheera. One day, Daasa and his gang get a job to separate two college lovers at the request of the boy's father. Daasa's gang goes to the college without Daasa to scare the girl away from the boy, but not before the girl's friend Kiran stands up to them away and tarnishes Daasa's name. In an attempt of revenge, Daasa changes his appearance to woo Kiran and eventually break up with her, emotionally hurting her. To do this, Daasa takes up an alias, Prajwal. However, he falls in love with Kiran and Kiran falls in love with him. 

Events come to a head when it is revealed that Kiran is Ranadheera's daughther, and Ranadheera discovers that Kiran is loving Daasa. Ranadheera reveals that her Prajwal and Daasa are the same; subsequently Kiran breaks up with Daasa, leaving him emotionally ruined. Kaveri, Ranadheera's assistant, tries to mend the relationship by revealing to Kiran her father's misdeeds and Daasa's reformed nature. As Kiran confronts her father about this, a drunk and enraged Daasa arrives and stabs Kiran, but not before Kiran reveals that she loves Daasa after discovering his true nature.

Daasa carries Kiran to the hospital, but is temporarily set back by a rival gangster Naga. During the battle, Kiran dies. After Daasa kills Naga, Ranadheera and the rest of the police force arrive, shooting and killing Daasa. Daasa takes his last breath looking at Kiran's body in his arms.

Cast

Production
Darshan, son of veteran actor Thoogudeepa Srinivas made his acting debut with this film. The film is Co-Produced by Ba.Ma. Harish and M.G. Ramamurthy under the banner Ullas Enterprises

Controversies
In March 2017, actor Kiccha Sudeep claimed that he was instrumental in getting Darshan a chance as actor for the film. But there  are controversial split statements given by the two co-producers. Ba.Ma. Harish has agreed with Sudeep's statement, whereas 
co-producer M.G. Ramamurthy has also agreed 
Sudeep's statement.

Music
The music of the film was composed by Sadhu Kokila and the lyrics were written by V. Nagendra Prasad.

References

External links
 movie review

2002 films
2000s Kannada-language films
Indian crime action films
2000s crime action films
Kannada films remade in other languages
Indian gangster films
2002 directorial debut films
Films directed by P. N. Sathya